Mauritania, officially the Islamic Republic of Mauritania, is a sovereign country in Northwest Africa. It is bordered by the Atlantic Ocean to the west, Western Sahara to the north and northwest, Algeria to the northeast, Mali to the east and southeast, and Senegal to the southwest. Mauritania is the 11th-largest country in Africa and the 28th-largest in the world, and 90% of its territory is situated in the Sahara. Most of its population of 4.4 million lives in the temperate south of the country, with roughly one-third concentrated in the capital and largest city, Nouakchott, located on the Atlantic coast.

The country's name derives from the ancient Berber kingdom of Mauretania, located in North Africa within the ancient Maghreb. Berbers occupied what is now Mauritania beginning in the third century AD. Arabs under the Umayyad Caliphate conquered the area in the late seventh century, bringing Islam, Arab culture, and the Arabic language. In the early 20th century, Mauritania was colonized by France as part of French West Africa. It achieved independence in 1960, but has since experienced recurrent coups and periods of military dictatorship. The most recent coup, in 2008, was led by General Mohamed Ould Abdel Aziz, who won subsequent presidential elections in 2009 and 2014. He was succeeded by Mohamed Ould Ghazouani following the 2019 elections, which were considered Mauritania's first peaceful transition of power since independence.

Mauritania is culturally and politically part of the Arab world; it is a member of the Arab League and Arabic is the sole official language. The official religion is Islam, and almost all inhabitants are Sunni Muslims. Despite its prevailing Arab identity, Mauritanian society is multiethnic; the Bidhan, or so-called "white moors", make up 30% of the population, while the Haratin, or so-called "black moors", comprise 40%. Both groups reflect a fusion of Arab-Berber ethnicity, language, and culture. The remaining 30% of the population comprises various sub-Saharan ethnic groups.

Despite an abundance of natural resources, including iron ore and petroleum, Mauritania remains poor; its economy is based primarily on agriculture, livestock, and fishing. Mauritania is known for its poor human-rights record, most notably the continued practice of slavery, a result of a historical caste system between the Bidhan and Haratin. It was the last country in the world to abolish slavery, in 1981, and criminalized it only in 2007.

Etymology
Mauritania takes its name from the ancient Berber kingdom that flourished beginning in the third century BC and later became the Roman province of Mauretania, which flourished into the seventh century AD. The two territories do not overlap, though; historical Mauretania was considerably further north than modern Mauritania, as it was spread out along the entire western half of the Mediterranean coast of Africa.

The term "Mauretania", in turn, derives from the Greek and Roman exonym for the Berber peoples of the region, the Mauri people. The word "Mauri" is also the root of the name for the Moors.

History

Early history

The ancient tribes of Mauritania were Berber, Niger-Congo, and Bafour peoples. The Bafour were among the first Saharan peoples to abandon their previously nomadic lifestyle and adopt a primarily agricultural one. In response to the gradual desiccation of the Sahara, they eventually migrated southward. Many of the Berber tribes have claimed to have Yemeni (and sometimes other Arab) origins. Little evidence supports those claims, although a 2000 DNA study of the Yemeni people did suggest some ancient connection might exist between the peoples.

The Umayyads were the first Arab Muslims to enter Mauritania. During the Islamic conquests, they made incursions into Mauritania and were present in the region by the end of the seventh century. Many Berber tribes in Mauritania fled the arrival of the Arabs to the Gao region in Mali.

Other peoples also migrated south past the Sahara and into West Africa. According to a dubious Arab tradition the Almoravids traveled south and conquered the ancient and extensive Ghana Empire around 1076. 
From 1644 to 1674, the indigenous peoples of the area that is modern Mauritania made what became their final effort to repel the Yemeni Maqil Arabs who were invading their territory. This effort, which was unsuccessful, is known as the Char Bouba War. The invaders were led by the Beni Hassan tribe. The descendants of the Beni Hassan warriors became the upper stratum of Moorish society. Hassaniya, a bedouin Arabic dialect named for  the Beni Hassan, became the dominant language among the largely nomadic population.

Berbers retained a niche influence by producing the majority of the region's marabouts, as those who preserve and teach Islamic tradition there are called.

Colonial history

Starting in the late 19th century, France laid claim to the territories of present-day Mauritania, from the Senegal River area northwards. In 1901, Xavier Coppolani took charge of the imperial mission. Through a combination of strategic alliances with Zawaya tribes and military pressure on the Hassane warrior nomads, he managed to extend French rule over the Mauritanian emirates. Beginning in 1903 and 1904, the French armies succeeded in occupying Trarza, Brakna, and Tagant, but the northern emirate of Adrar held out longer, aided by the anticolonial rebellion (or jihad) of shaykh Maa al-Aynayn and by insurgents from Tagant and the other occupied regions. In 1904, France organized the territory of Mauritania, and it became part of French West Africa, first as a protectorate and later as a colony. In 1912, the French armies defeated Adrar, and incorporated it into the territory of Mauritania.

French rule brought legal prohibitions against slavery and an end to interclan warfare. During the colonial period, 90% of the population remained nomadic. Gradually, many individuals belonging to sedentary peoples, whose ancestors had been expelled centuries earlier, began to migrate into Mauritania. Until 1960, the capital of French West Africa was Saint-Louis, in Senegal. When Senegal gained its independence that year, France chose Nouakchott as the site of the new capital of Mauritania. At the time, Nouakchott was little more than a fortified village (or ksar).

After Mauritanian independence, larger numbers of indigenous sub-Saharan African peoples (Haalpulaar, Soninke, and Wolof) migrated into it, most of them settling in the area north of the Senegal River. Many of these new arrivals had been educated in the French language and French customs, and became clerks, soldiers, and administrators in the new state. At the same time, the French were militarily suppressing the most intransigent Hassane tribes in the north. French pressure on those tribes altered the existing balance of power, and new conflicts arose between the southern populations and the Moors.

Modern-day slavery still exists in different forms in Mauritania. According to some estimates, thousands of Mauritanians are still enslaved. A 2012 CNN report, "Slavery's Last Stronghold", documents the ongoing slave-owning cultures. This social discrimination is applied chiefly against the "black Moors" (Haratin) in the northern part of the country, where tribal elites among "white Moors" (Bidh'an, Hassaniya-speaking Arabs and Arabized Berbers) hold sway. Slavery practices exist also within the sub-Saharan African ethnic groups of the south.

The great Sahel droughts of the early 1970s caused massive devastation in Mauritania, exacerbating problems of poverty and conflict. The arabized dominant elites reacted to changing circumstances, and to Arab nationalist calls from abroad, by increasing pressure to arabize many aspects of Mauritanian life, such as law and the education system. This was also a reaction to the consequences of the French domination under the colonial rule. Various models for maintaining the country's cultural diversity have been suggested, but none have been successfully implemented.

This ethnic discord was evident during intercommunal violence that broke out in April 1989 (the "Mauritania–Senegal Border War"), but has since subsided. Mauritania expelled some 70,000 sub-Saharan African Mauritanians in the late 1980s. Ethnic tensions and the sensitive issue of slavery – past and, in some areas, present – are still powerful themes in the country's political debate. A significant number from all groups seek a more diverse, pluralistic society.

Conflict with Western Sahara

The International Court of Justice has concluded that in spite of some evidence of both Morocco's and Mauritania's legal ties prior to Spanish colonization, neither set of ties was sufficient to affect the application of the UN General Assembly Declaration on the Granting of Independence to Colonial Countries and Peoples to Western Sahara.

Mauritania, along with Morocco, annexed the territory of Western Sahara in 1976, with Mauritania taking the lower one-third at the request of Spain, a former imperial power. After several military losses to the Polisario – heavily armed and supported by Algeria, the regional power and rival to Morocco – Mauritania withdrew in 1979. Its claims were taken over by Morocco.

Due to economic weakness, Mauritania has been a negligible player in the territorial dispute, with its official position being that it wishes for an expedient solution that is mutually agreeable to all parties. While most of Western Sahara has been occupied by Morocco, the UN still considers the Western Sahara a territory that needs to express its wishes with respect to statehood. A referendum, originally scheduled for 1992, is still supposed to be held at some point in the future, under UN auspices, to determine whether or not the indigenous Sahrawis wish to be independent, as the Sahrawi Arab Democratic Republic, or to be part of Morocco.

Ould Daddah era (1960–1978)

Mauritania became an independent nation in November 1960. In 1964 President Moktar Ould Daddah, originally installed by the French, formalized Mauritania as a one-party state with a new constitution, setting up an authoritarian presidential regime. Daddah's own Parti du Peuple Mauritanien  became the ruling organization in a one-party system. The President justified this on the grounds that Mauritania was not ready for western-style multiparty democracy. Under this one-party constitution, Daddah was re-elected in uncontested elections in 1976 and 1978.

Daddah was ousted in a bloodless coup on 10 July 1978. He had brought the country to near-collapse through the disastrous war to annex the southern part of Western Sahara, framed as an attempt to create a "Greater Mauritania".

CMRN and CMSN military governments (1978–1984)

Col. Mustafa Ould Salek's Military Committee for National Recovery junta proved incapable of either establishing a strong base of power or extracting the country from its destabilizing conflict with the Sahrawi resistance movement, the Polisario Front. It quickly fell, to be replaced by another military government, the Military Committee for National Salvation.

The energetic Colonel Mohamed Khouna Ould Haidallah soon emerged as its strongman. By giving up all claims to Western Sahara, he found peace with the Polisario and improved relations with its main backer, Algeria, but relations with Morocco, the other party to the conflict, and its European ally France, deteriorated. Instability continued, and Haidallah's ambitious reform attempts foundered. His regime was plagued by attempted coups and intrigue within the military establishment. It became increasingly contested due to his harsh and uncompromising measures against opponents; many dissidents were jailed, and some executed. In 1981, slavery was formally abolished by law, making Mauritania the last country in the world to do so.

Ould Taya's rule (1984–2005)

In December 1984, Haidallah was deposed by Colonel Maaouya Ould Sid'Ahmed Taya, who, while retaining tight military control, relaxed the political climate.

Ould Taya moderated Mauritania's previous pro-Algerian stance, and re-established ties with Morocco during the late 1980s. He deepened these ties during the late 1990s and early 2000s, as part of Mauritania's drive to attract support from Western states and Western-aligned Arab states. Mauritania has not rescinded its recognition of Polisario's Western Saharian exile government, and remains on good terms with Algeria. Its position on the Western Sahara conflict has been, since the 1980s, one of strict neutrality.

The Mauritania–Senegal Border War started as a result of a conflict in Diawara between Moorish Mauritanian herders and Senegalese farmers over grazing rights. On 9 April 1989, Mauritanian guards killed two Senegalese.
Following the incident, several riots erupted in Bakel, Dakar and other towns in Senegal, directed against the mainly Arabized Mauritanians who dominated the local retail business. The rioting, adding to already existing tensions, led to a campaign of terror against black Mauritanians, who are often seen as 'Senegalese' by Bidha'an, regardless of their nationality. As low scale conflict with Senegal continued into 1990/91, the Mauritanian government engaged in or encouraged acts of violence and seizures of property directed against the Halpularen ethnic group. The tension culminated in an international airlift agreed to by Senegal and Mauritania under international pressure to prevent further violence. The Mauritanian Government expelled thousands of black Mauritanians. Most of these so-called 'Senegalese' had few or no ties with Senegal, and many have been repatriated from Senegal and Mali after 2007. The exact number of expulsions is not known but the United Nations High Commissioner for Refugees (UNHCR) estimates that, as of June 1991, 52,995 Mauritanian refugees were living in Senegal and at least 13,000 in Mali.

Opposition parties were legalized and a new Constitution approved in 1991 which put an end to formal military rule. However, President Ould Taya's election wins were dismissed as fraudulent by some opposition groups.

In the late 1980s, Ould Taya had established close co-operation with Iraq, and pursued a strongly Arab nationalist line. Mauritania grew increasingly isolated internationally, and tensions with Western countries grew dramatically after it took a pro-Iraqi position during the 1991 Gulf War. During the mid-to late 1990s, Mauritania shifted its foreign policy to one of increased co-operation with the US and Europe. It was rewarded with diplomatic normalization and aid projects. On 28 October 1999, Mauritania joined Egypt, Palestine, and Jordan as the only members of the Arab League to officially recognize Israel. Ould Taya also started co-operating with the United States in anti-terrorism activities, a policy that was criticized by some human rights organizations. (See also Foreign relations of Mauritania.)

During the regime of President Ould Taya Mauritania developed economically, oil was discovered in 2001 by the Woodside Company.

August 2005 military coup

On 3 August 2005, a military coup led by Colonel Ely Ould Mohamed Vall ended President Maaouya Ould Sid'Ahmed Taya's twenty-one years of rule. Taking advantage of Ould Taya's attendance at the funeral of Saudi King Fahd, the military, including members of the presidential guard, seized control of key points in the capital Nouakchott. The coup proceeded without loss of life. Calling themselves the Military Council for Justice and Democracy, the officers released the following statement:

"The national armed forces and security forces have unanimously decided to put a definitive end to the oppressive activities of the defunct authority, which our people have suffered from during the past years."

The Military Council later issued another statement naming Colonel Mohamed Vall as president and director of the national police force, the Sûreté Nationale. Vall, once regarded as a firm ally of the now-ousted president, had aided Ould Taya in the coup that had originally brought him to power, and had later served as his security chief. Sixteen other officers were listed as members of the council.

Though cautiously watched by the international community, the coup came to be generally accepted, with the military junta organizing elections within a promised two-year timeline. In a referendum on 26 June 2006, Mauritanians overwhelmingly (97%) approved a new constitution that limited the duration of a president's stay in office. The leader of the junta, Col. Vall, promised to abide by the referendum and relinquish power peacefully. Mauritania's establishment of relations with Israelit is one of only three Arab states to recognize Israelwas maintained by the new regime, despite widespread criticism from the opposition. They considered that position as a legacy of the Taya regime's attempts to curry favor with the West.

Parliamentary and municipal elections in Mauritania took place on 19 November and 3 December 2006.

2007 presidential elections

Mauritania's first fully democratic presidential elections took place on 11 March 2007. The elections effected the final transfer from military to civilian rule following the military coup in 2005. This was the first time since Mauritania gained independence in 1960 that it elected a president in a multi-candidate election.

The elections were won in a second round of voting by Sidi Ould Cheikh Abdallahi, with Ahmed Ould Daddah a close second.

2008 military coup

On 6 August 2008, the head of the presidential guards took over the president's palace in Nouakchott, a day after 48 lawmakers from the ruling party resigned in protest of President Abdallahi's policies. The army surrounded key government facilities, including the state television building, after the president fired senior officers, one of them the head of the presidential guards. The President, Prime Minister Yahya Ould Ahmed Waghef, and Mohamed Ould R'zeizim, Minister of Internal Affairs, were arrested.

The coup was coordinated by General Mohamed Ould Abdel Aziz, former chief of staff of the Mauritanian Army and head of the presidential guard, who had recently been fired. Mauritania's presidential spokesman, Abdoulaye Mamadouba, said the President, Prime Minister, and Interior Minister had been arrested by renegade Senior Mauritanian army officers and were being held under house arrest at the presidential palace in the capital. In the apparently successful and bloodless coup, Abdallahi's daughter, Amal Mint Cheikh Abdallahi, said: "The security agents of the BASEP (Presidential Security Battalion) came to our home and took away my father." The coup plotters, all dismissed in a presidential decree shortly beforehand, included Abdel Aziz, General Muhammad Ould Al-Ghazwani, General Philippe Swikri, and Brigadier General (Aqid) Ahmad Ould Bakri.

After the coup

A Mauritanian lawmaker, Mohammed Al Mukhtar, claimed that many of the country's people supported the takeover of a government that had become "an authoritarian regime" under a president who had "marginalized the majority in parliament." The coup was also backed by Abdallahi's rival in the 2007 election, Ahmed Ould Daddah. However, Abdel Aziz's regime was isolated internationally, and became subject to diplomatic sanctions and the cancellation of some aid projects. It found few foreign supporters (among them Morocco, Libya and Iran), while Algeria, the United States, France and other European countries criticized the coup, and continued to refer to Abdallahi as the legitimate president of Mauritania. Domestically, a group of parties coalesced around Abdallahi to continue protesting the coup, which caused the junta to ban demonstrations and crack down on opposition activists. International and internal pressure eventually forced the release of Abdallahi, who was instead placed under house arrest in his home village. The new government broke off relations with Israel. In March 2010, Mauritania's female foreign minister Mint Hamdi Ould Mouknass announced that Mauritania had cut ties with Israel in a "complete and definitive way."

After the coup, Abdel Aziz insisted on holding new presidential elections to replace Abdallahi, but was forced to reschedule them due to internal and international opposition. During the spring of 2009, the junta negotiated an understanding with some opposition figures and international parties. As a result, Abdallahi formally resigned under protest, as it became clear that some opposition forces had defected from him and most international players, notably including France and Algeria, now aligned with Abdel Aziz. The United States continued to criticize the coup, but did not actively oppose the elections.

Aziz era 
Abdallahi's resignation allowed the election of Abdel Aziz as civilian president, on 18 July, by a 52% majority. Many of Abdallahi's former supporters criticised this as a political ploy and refused to recognize the results. They argued that the election had been falsified due to junta control, and complained that the international community had let down the opposition. Despite complaints, the elections were almost unanimously accepted by Western, Arab and African countries, which lifted sanctions and resumed relations with Mauritania. By late summer, Abdel Aziz appeared to have secured his position and to have gained widespread international and internal support. Some figures, such as Senate chairman Messaoud Ould Boulkheir, continued to refuse the new order and call for Abdel Aziz's resignation.

In February 2011, the waves of the Arab Spring spread to Mauritania, where thousands of people took to the streets of the capital.

In November 2014, Mauritania was invited as a non-member guest nation to the G20 summit in Brisbane.

The national flag of Mauritania was changed on 4 August 2017. Two red stripes were added as a symbol of the country's sacrifice and defense.

In August 2019, Mohamed Ould Ghazouani was sworn in as Mauritania's tenth president since its independence from France in 1960.
His predecessor  Mohamed Ould Abdel Aziz ran the  country for 10 years. The ruling party Union for the Republic (UPR) was founded by Aziz in 2009.

In June 2021, former president  Abdel Aziz was arrested amidst a corruption probe into allegations of embezzlement, following a parliamentary inquiry which was launched in the fall of 2019.

Geography 

Mauritania lies in the western region of the continent of Africa, and is generally flat, its 1,030,700 square kilometres forming vast, arid plains broken by occasional ridges and clifflike outcroppings. It borders the North Atlantic Ocean, between Senegal and Western Sahara, Mali and Algeria. It is considered part of both the Sahel and the Maghreb. Approximately three-quarters of Mauritania is desert or semidesert. As a result of extended, severe drought, the desert has been expanding since the mid-1960s.

A series of scarps face southwest, longitudinally bisecting these plains in the center of the country. Spring-fed oases lie at the foot of some of the scarps. Isolated peaks, often rich in minerals, rise above the plateaus; the smaller peaks are called guelbs and the larger ones kedias. The concentric Guelb er Richat is a prominent feature of the north-central region. The plateaus gradually descend toward the northeast to the barren El Djouf, or "Empty Quarter," a vast region of large sand dunes that merges into the Sahara Desert. To the west, between the ocean and the plateaus, are alternating areas of clayey plains (regs) and sand dunes (ergs), some of which shift from place to place, gradually moved by high winds. The dunes generally increase in size and mobility toward the north.

Belts of natural vegetation, corresponding to the rainfall pattern, extend from east to west and range from traces of tropical forest along the Sénégal River to brush and savanna in the southeast. Only sandy desert is found in the centre and north of the country. Mauritania is home to seven terrestrial ecoregions: Sahelian Acacia savanna, West Sudanian savanna, Saharan halophytics, Atlantic coastal desert, North Saharan steppe and woodlands, South Saharan steppe and woodlands, and West Saharan montane xeric woodlands.

The Richat Structure, dubbed the "Eye of the Sahara", is a formation of rock resembling concentric circles in the Adrar Plateau, near Ouadane, west–central Mauritania.

Wildlife
Mauritania's wildlife has two main influences as the country lies in two biogeographic realms, the north sits in the Palearctic which extends south from the Sahara to roughly 19° north and the south in the Afrotropic realms. Additionally Mauritania is important for numerous birds which migrate from the Palearctic to winter there.

Most of the north to about 19° north is regarded as being in the palearctic, and is largely made up of the Sahara desert and adjacent littoral habitats. South of this is regarded as being in the afrotropical biogeographic realm, which means that species of a predominantly Afrotropical distribution dominate the fauna. South of the Sahara is the South Saharan steppe and woodlands ecoregion which integrates into the Sahelian acacia savanna ecoregion. The southernmost part of the country lies in the West Sudanian savanna ecoregion.

Wetlands are important and the two main protected areas are the Banc d'Arguin National Park which protects rich, shallow coastal and marine ecosystems which integrates with the arid Sahara desert and the Diawling National Park which forms the northern part of the delta of the Senegal River. Elsewhere in Mauritania wetlands are normally ephemeral and rely on the seasonal rainfall and may be very important for migratory birds.

Government and politics

The Mauritanian Parliament is composed of a single chamber, the National Assembly. Composed of 157 members, representatives are elected for a five-year term in single-seat constituencies.

Until 2017, the parliament had an upper house, the Senate. The Senate had 56 members, 53 members elected for a six-year term by municipal councillors with one-third renewed every two years and 3 members elected by Mauritanians abroad. It was abolished in 2017, after a referendum. President Mohamed Ould Abdel Aziz called for the referendum in August 2017 after the Senate rejected his proposals to change the constitution.

The president of Mauritania is directly elected by absolute majority popular vote in 2 rounds if needed for a 5-year term (eligible for a second term). The last election was held on 22 June 2019, next scheduled for 22 June 2024. The prime minister is appointed by the president.

Administrative divisions 

The government bureaucracy is composed of traditional ministries, special agencies, and parastatal companies. The Ministry of Interior spearheads a system of regional governors and prefects modeled on the French system of local administration. Under this system, Mauritania is divided into 15 regions (wilaya or régions).

Control is tightly concentrated in the executive branch of the central government, but a series of national and municipal elections since 1992 have produced limited decentralization. These regions are subdivided into 44 departments (moughataa). The regions and capital district (in alphabetical order) and their capitals are:

Economy 

Despite being rich in natural resources, Mauritania has a low GDP. A majority of the population still depends on agriculture and livestock for a livelihood, even though most of the nomads and many subsistence farmers were forced into the cities by recurrent droughts in the 1970s and 1980s. Mauritania has extensive deposits of iron ore, which account for almost 50% of total exports. Gold and copper mining companies are opening mines in the interior.

The country's first deepwater port opened near Nouakchott in 1986. In recent years, drought and economic mismanagement have resulted in a buildup of foreign debt. In March 1999, the government signed an agreement with a joint World Bank-International Monetary Fund mission on a $54 million enhanced structural adjustment facility (ESAF). Privatization remains one of the key issues. Mauritania is unlikely to meet ESAF's annual GDP growth objectives of 4–5%.

Oil was discovered in Mauritania in 2001 in the offshore Chinguetti field. Although potentially significant for the Mauritanian economy, its overall influence is difficult to predict. Mauritania has been described as a "desperately poor desert nation, which straddles the Arab and African worlds and is Africa's newest, if small-scale, oil producer." There may be additional oil reserves inland in the Taoudeni basin, although the harsh environment will make extraction expensive.

Demographics 

 
, Mauritania has a population of approximately 4.3 million. The local population is composed of three main ethnicities: Bidhan or white Moors, Haratin or black moors, and West Africans. 30% Bidhan, 40% Haratin, and 30% others (mostly Black Sub-Saharans). Local statistics bureau estimations indicate that the Bidhan represent around 30% of citizens. They speak Hassaniya Arabic and are primarily of Arab-Berber origin. The Haratin constitute roughly 34% of the population. With many estimates putting them at around 40%. They are descendants of the original inhabitants of the Tassili n'Ajjer and Acacus Mountain sites during the Epipalaeolithic era. The remaining 30% of the population largely consists of various ethnic groups of West African descent. Among these are the Niger-Congo-speaking Halpulaar (Fulbe), Soninke, Bambara and Wolof.

Largest cities

Religion

Mauritania is almost 100% Muslim, with most inhabitants adhering to the Sunni denomination. The Sufi orders, the Tijaniyah and the Qadiriyyah, have great influence not only in the country, but in Morocco, Algeria, Senegal and other neighborhood countries as well. The Roman Catholic Diocese of Nouakchott, founded in 1965, serves the 4,500 Catholics in Mauritania (mostly foreign residents from West Africa and Europe).

There are extreme restrictions on freedom of religion and belief in Mauritania; it is one of thirteen countries in the world that punish atheism by death. On 27 April 2018, The National Assembly passed a law that makes the death penalty mandatory for anyone convicted of "blasphemous speech" and acts deemed "sacrilegious". The new law eliminates the possibility under article 306 of substituting prison terms for the death penalty for certain apostasy-related crimes if the offender promptly repents. The law also provides for a sentence of up to two years in prison and a fine of up to 600,000 Ouguiyas (approximately EUR 14,630) for "offending public indecency and Islamic values" and for "breaching Allah’s prohibitions" or assisting in their breach.

Languages

Arabic is the official and national language of Mauritania. The local spoken variety, known as Hassaniya, contains many Berber words and significantly differs from the Modern Standard Arabic that is used for official communication. Pulaar, Soninke and Wolof also serve as national languages. French is widely used in the media and among educated classes.

Health

As of 2011, life expectancy at birth was 61.14 years. Per capita expenditure on health was 43 US$ (PPP) in 2004. Public expenditure was 2% of the GDP in 2004 and private 0.9% of the GDP in 2004. In the early 21st century, there were 11 physicians per 100,000 people. Infant mortality is 60.42 deaths/1,000 live births (2011 estimate).

The obesity rate among Mauritanian women is high, perhaps in part due to the traditional standards of beauty in some regions by which obese women are considered beautiful while thin women are considered sickly.

Education 

Since 1999, all teaching in the first year of primary school is in Modern Standard Arabic; French is introduced in the second year, and is used to teach all scientific courses. The use of English is increasing.

Mauritania has the University of Nouakchott and other institutions of higher education, but the majority of highly educated Mauritanians have studied outside the country. Public expenditure on education was at 10.1% of 2000–2007 government expenditure.

Human rights 

The Abdallahi government was widely perceived as corrupt and restricted access to government information. Sexism, racism, female genital mutilation, child labour, human trafficking, and the political marginalization of largely southern-based ethnic groups continued to be problems. Homosexuality is illegal and is a capital offence in Mauritania.

Following the 2008 coup, the military government of Mauritania faced severe international sanctions and internal unrest. Amnesty International accused it of practicing coordinated torture against criminal and political detainees. Amnesty has accused the Mauritanian legal system, both before and after the 2008 coup, of functioning with complete disregard for legal procedure, fair trial, or humane imprisonment. The organization has said that the Mauritanian government has practiced institutionalized and continuous use of torture throughout its post-independence history, under all its leaders.

Amnesty International in 2008 alleged that torture was common in Mauritania, stating that its usage is "deeply anchored in the culture of the security forces", which use it "as a system of investigation and repression". Forms of torture employed include cigarette burns, electric shocks and sexual violence, stated Amnesty International. In 2014, the United States Department of State identified torture by Mauritanian law enforcement as one of the "central human rights problems" in the country. Juan E. Méndez, an independent expert on human rights from the United Nations, reported in 2016 that legal protections against torture were present but not applied in Mauritania, pointing to an "almost total absence of investigations into allegations of torture".

According to the US State Department 2010 Human Rights Report, abuses in Mauritania include:
...mistreatment of detainees and prisoners; security force impunity; lengthy pretrial detention; harsh prison conditions; arbitrary arrests; limits on freedom of the press and assembly; corruption; discrimination against women; female genital mutilation (FGM); child marriage; political marginalization of southern-based ethnic groups; racial and ethnic discrimination; slavery and slavery-related practices; and child labor.

Modern slavery

Slavery persists in Mauritania, despite it being outlawed. It is the result of a historical caste system, resulting in descent-based slavery. Those enslaved are darker-skinned Haratin, with their owners being lighter-skinned Moors.

In 1905, the French colonial administration declared an end of slavery in Mauritania, with very little success. Although nominally abolished in 1981, it was not illegal to own slaves until 2007.

The US State Department 2010 Human Rights Report states, "Government efforts were not sufficient to enforce the antislavery law. No cases have been successfully prosecuted under the antislavery law despite the fact that de facto slavery exists in Mauritania."

In 2012, it was estimated that 10% to 20% of the population of Mauritania (between 340,000 and 680,000 people) live in slavery.

That same year, a government minister stated that slavery "no longer exists" in Mauritania. However, according to the Walk Free Foundation's Global Slavery Index, there were an estimated 90,000 enslaved people in Mauritania in 2018, or around 2% of the population.

Obstacles to ending slavery in Mauritania include:
 The difficulty of enforcing any laws in the country's vast desert.
 Poverty that limits opportunities for slaves to support themselves if freed.
 Belief that slavery is part of the natural order of this society.

Culture 

Tuareg and Mauritanian silversmiths have developed traditions of traditional Berber jewellery and metalwork that have been worn by Mauritanian women and men. According to studies of Tuareg and Mauretanian jewellery, the latter are usually more embellished and may carry typical pyramidal elements.

Filming for several documentaries and films has taken place in Mauritania, including Fort Saganne (1984), The Fifth Element (1997), Winged Migration (2001), and Timbuktu (2014).

The TV show Atlas of Cursed Places (2020) that aired on the Discovery Channel & National Geographic Channel had an episode that mentions Mauritania as a possible location for the lost city of Atlantis . The location they consider is a geological formation consisting of a series of rings known as the Richat Structure which is located in the Western Sahara.

The T'heydinn is part of Moorish oral tradition.

The libraries of Chinguetti contain thousands of medieval manuscripts.

See also 

 Index of Mauritania-related articles
 Outline of Mauritania
 Telephone numbers in Mauritania

References 

 US State Department 
 Encyclopædia Britannica, Mauritania – Country Page

Notes

Further reading

External links 

 République Islamique de Mauritanie (official government website at archive.org) 
 République Islamique de Mauritanie (official government website at archive.org)  
 Mauritania. The World Factbook. Central Intelligence Agency.
 
 
 Mauritania profile from the BBC News.
 
Country profile and timeline Conservative Middle East Council
 Forecasts for Mauritania Development

 
 
Arabic-speaking countries and territories
French-speaking countries and territories
Islamic republics
Least developed countries
Maghrebi countries
Member states of the Organisation internationale de la Francophonie
Member states of the African Union
Member states of the Arab League
Member states of the Organisation of Islamic Cooperation
Member states of the United Nations
Military dictatorships
States and territories established in 1960
West African countries
North African countries
Saharan countries
Countries in Africa
Non-Aligned Movement